Tillandsia oropezana is a species in the genus Tillandsia. This species is endemic to Bolivia.

References
 

oropezana
Flora of Bolivia